Baryphas eupogon is a species of jumping spiders native to São Tomé and Príncipe. The species was named by Eugène Simon in 1902.

The male holotype measures 5 mm.

References

Salticidae
Spiders of Africa
Spiders described in 1902
Endemic fauna of São Tomé and Príncipe
Fauna of São Tomé Island